Lee Jae-hoon (born July 30, 1974) is a South Korean singer and television personality. He is a member of the band Cool.

Biography 
Jae-hoon revealed in his fancafe on February 5, 2020 that he married his long-term girlfriend back in 2009. His daughter was then born in 2010 and his son in 2013.

Discography

Studio albums

Extended plays

Singles

References

External links
Official blog

1974 births
Living people
South Korean television personalities
South Korean dance musicians
21st-century South Korean male  singers